Slănic may refer to several places in Romania:
 Slănic, a spa town in Prahova County
 Slănic-Moldova, a town in Bacău County
 Slănic, a village in Aninoasa commune, Argeș County
 Slănic (Bratia), a tributary of the Bratia in Argeș County
 Slănic (Buzău), a tributary of the Buzău in Buzău County
 Slănic (Ialomița), a tributary of the Ialomița in Dâmbovița County
 Slănic (Trotuș), a tributary of the Trotuș in Bacău County
 Slănic (Vărbilău), a tributary of the Vărbilău in Prahova County 
 Slănic de Răzvad, a tributary of the Ialomița in Dâmbovița County